The Hyundai Green City (hangul:현대 그린시티) is a heavy-duty bus manufactured by the truck & bus division of Hyundai. Based on the Hyundai Aero City, it primarily available as short-body city bus and tourist buses.

The Global 900's main competitors with the Kia AM, Daewoo BS090 and Daewoo BM090.

First Generation (CY) 2002-2010

The First Generation Hyundai Global 900 was introduced in 2002.

Global 900 (August 2002-October 2004)

The Global 900 was launched in 2002 with two engine options, the diesel version is powered by Mercedes Benz OM906LA and Hyundai C6AB for the CNG version.

New Global 900 (November 2004-January 2008)

In 2004, the engine options were now updated, the diesel version has the new Hyundai DB9A  producing 260hp while the CNG version still comes with C6AB making 240hp.

In 2005, tourist versions are now available, the drivers protection bulkheads is now added as an option in 2006.

New Global 900 Facelift (January 2008-May 2010)

The Changes in 2008 is the replacement of the power antenna with the loop antenna. Diesel versions now comes with D6GA producing 250-255hp, D6GB producing 260hp, the CNG version is stuck with the C6AB still producing 240hp.

Green City (2010-present)

The Green City was launched in May 2010 with several changes, the CNG version has the new Euro 4 G240 replacing the C6AB and new taramat flooring. In 2011 CD Audio and MP3 player was added. In 2012, the G260 Euro 5 260hp engine is now added, and in 2015 the G280 Euro 6 280hp engine is also added.

In 2017, the ultrasonic sensors and Call buzzers have been added, and USB ports are also added to the audio system.

Lineup

 City Bus (LM-C)
 LM-EC (City Bus)
 LM-FC

 Intercity Bus/Private (LM-A)
 LM-GA
 LM-AA

See also

Hyundai Motor Company
Hyundai Aero
Hyundai Aero City
 List of buses

Rear-wheel-drive vehicles
Low-floor buses
Coaches (bus)
Midibuses

Hyundai buses